Clumber may refer to: 

 Clumber Park (formerly the site of Clumber House) - a country park and National Trust property in Nottinghamshire, UK
 Clumber Chapel - The Church of St. Mary the Virgin, Clumber Park, Nottinghamshire, UK
 Clumber papers, Clumber collection, or Newcastle of Clumber papers - part of the Manuscripts and Special Collections, The University of Nottingham 
 Clumber Spaniel - a dog breed developed in Britain 
 Clumber - a character in the John Ford film The World Moves On (1934) 
 Clumber - a British LNER Class B17 locomotive (1930-1969) 
 Clumber - a populated place in Anne Arundel County, Maryland, United States
 Clumber - a populated place southwest of Brisbane, Queensland, Australia